Sălacea is a commune in Bihor County, Crișana, Romania with a population of 3,036. It is composed of two villages, Otomani (Ottomány) and Sălacea. The Otomani culture, a local Bronze Age culture (2100-1600 BC), takes its name from the village of Otomani.

References

External links
 http://www.eliznik.org.uk/EastEurope/History/balkans-map/middle-bronze.htm#nogo

Communes in Bihor County
Localities in Crișana